Eugene F. Scanlon Jr. is a former judge of Common Pleas in Allegheny County.

References

Living people
Year of birth missing (living people)
20th-century American judges
20th-century American lawyers
21st-century American judges
Judges of the Pennsylvania Courts of Common Pleas
Pennsylvania lawyers
People from Allegheny County, Pennsylvania